Roberto Cocco (born May 16, 1977) is an Italian super middleweight Muay Thai kickboxer and boxer, fighting out of Dojo Miura in his home town of Turin, Italy.  He is a former three time I.S.K.A. kickboxing world champion and one time World Kickboxing Network (W.K.N.) Thai-boxing world Champion.

Biography / Career

Roberto started learning martial arts aged six in his home town of Turin.  He began with Judo but would soon progress to kickboxing despite initial attempts by his parents to discourage him.  Through his teen years he attended several competitions in full contact kickboxing and boxing winning the Italian title at amateur level.  In 1995 he started to learn Thai-boxing under coach Marco Franza and would turn pro not long after.  In 2001, after picking up a number of victories on the domestic scene or across the border in France, Roberto had his first shot at a major title.  He faced Carlos Heredia for the I.S.K.A. world title, winning a decision victory after twelve rounds – something Cocco was not used to, having usually faced opponents over three to five rounds.

As a new world champion, doors opened for Roberto and he found himself in position for more honours; defeating Stephan Mbida to claim the W.P.K.C. intercontinental belt, and then going across to São Paulo, Brazil to unify the I.S.K.A. and U.W.K.F. world titles.  Throughout 2003, Cocco would defend his I.S.K.A. belt for the second time and win the W.K.N. world title by defeating Carlos Heredia once again, this time only taking one round as opposed to twelve, in a TKO victory.

In 2003 he signed with the recently created SuperLeague, defeating Foad Sadeghi by knockout in his organizational debut in Vienna.  By joining the promotion Roberto would face a much stiffer rate of competition, with many of his rivals European and world champions with plenty of fight experience.  He found this out to his cost when he faced Joerie Mes in his next SuperLeague match, losing by KO in the fourth round.  Between 2003 and 2006 (when the promoted ceased to exist), Roberto had a losing record with SuperLeague, good wins against Foad Sadeghi and Moises Baptista De Sousa tempered by a number of defeats, finishing with a 2 and 7 record with the promotion.  He had some success on other circuits, however, defeating Roberto Castro in 2005 to claim the W.A.K.O. Pro world title.

As SuperLeague folded, Cocco started focusing more on professional boxing defeating former kickboxing rival Alexander Dredhaj on his debut in 2006.  He would have a number of boxing bouts in his native Italy, culminating in a fight for the vacant W.B.C. Mediterranean title, losing a decision to Nikola Sjekloca.  So far, unable to replicate his success on the kickboxing circuit he would be unsuccessful in his two other boxing title fights to date, losing three fights for the Italian title in 2008 and 2010 (two times).  Returning to kickboxing action in Europe, in between boxing, Cocco managed to pick up some good wins, defeating Thomas Hladky and multiple Muaythai world champion Rayen Simson to claim the Kings of Kickboxing Munich title in 2007, but dropping decisions to Yohan Lidon, Jiri Zak and Dmitry Shakuta.

He lost to Yury Bessmertny by TKO due to a cut at Thai Boxe Mania in Turin, Italy on November 24, 2012. Even though the cut was caused by an accidental headbutt, Bessmertny was given the win rather than the bout being made a no contest.

He lost a unanimous decision to Karapet Karapetyan at Glory 7: Milan in Milan, Italy on April 20, 2013.

He became W.K.N. Super Middleweight Oriental Rules Intercontinental Kickboxing Champion, facing Yoann Kongolo at Thai Boxe Mania in Turin, Italy on January 25, 2014, winning by judges split decision.

Titles

Kickboxing:
 2013 W.K.N. Oriental Rules Super Middleweight Intercontinental Title -79.4 kg
 2007 "Kings of Kickboxing" Munich preliminary tournament title -75 kg
 2005 Kombat League Venezia K-1 rules tournament champion -76 kg
 2005 W.A.K.O. Pro Full-Contact middleweight world champion -75 kg
 2003 W.K.N. Thai-boxing super welterweight world champion -72.6 kg
 2003 I.S.K.A. Full-Contact middleweight world champion -75 kg (2nd title defence)
 2002 U.W.K.F. Full-Contact middleweight world title -75 kg
 2002 I.S.K.A. Full-Contact middleweight world champion -75 kg (1st title defence)
 2002 W.P.K.C. Thai-boxing intercontinental champion -76 kg
 2001 I.S.K.A. Full-Contact middleweight world champion -75 kg
Boxing:

2013 F.P.I. Italian Super Middleweight Title in Santa Margherita Ligure, Italy 
2012 F.P.I. Italian Super Middleweight Title in Turin, Italy 
2008 F.P.I. Super Middleweight ProCup  in Adria, Italy

Kickboxing record 

|-
|-  bgcolor="CCFFCC"
| 2014-01-25 || Win||align=left| Yoann Kongolo || Thai Boxe Mania || Turin, Italy ||Decision (split) ||5 || 2:00
|-
! style=background:white colspan=9 |
|-
|-  bgcolor="FFBBBB"
| 2013-04-20 || Loss ||align=left| Karapet Karapetyan || Glory 7: Milan || Milan, Italy || Decision (unanimous) || 3 || 3:00 
|-
|-  bgcolor="FFBBBB"
| 2012-02-05 || Loss ||align=left| Yury Bessmertny || Thai Boxe Mania || Turin, Italy || TKO (cut) || || 
|-
|-  bgcolor="FFBBBB"
| 2012-02-05 || Loss ||align=left| Artur Kyshenko || Thai Boxe Mania || Turin, Italy || Decision (Unanimous) || 3 || 3:00
|-  bgcolor="#FFBBBB"
| 2011-11-06 || Loss ||align=left| Artem Levin || Muay Thai Premier League: Round 3 || The Hague, Netherlands || TKO || || 
|-  bgcolor="#FFBBBB"
| 2011-10-08 || Loss ||align=left| Kaoklai Kaennorsing || Muaythai Premier League: Round 2 || Padua, Italy || Decision (Unanimous)  || 5 || 3:00
|-
|-  bgcolor="#CCFFCC"
| 2011-03-18 || Win ||align=left| Marius Tiţă || SUPERKOMBAT The Pilot Show || Râmnicu Vâlcea, Romania || Decision (Unanimous) || 3 || 3:00
|-
|-  bgcolor="#CCFFCC"
| 2011-02-26 || Win ||align=left| Aurel Pirtea || X1 Boxing Promotion || Turin, Italy || Decision || 3 || 3:00
|-
|-  bgcolor="#CCFFCC"
| 2010-11-13 || Win ||align=left| Mario Agatic || X1 Boxing Promotion || Ivrea, Italy || Decision || 3 || 3:00
|-
|-  bgcolor="#CCFFCC"
| 2010-10-30 || Win ||align=left| Barish Tunal || X1 Boxing Promotion || Turin, Italy || KO || 1 || 
|-
|-  bgcolor="#FFBBBB"
| 2008-04-12 || Loss ||align=left| Dmitry Shakuta || K-1 Italy Oktagon 2008 || Milan, Italy || Decision (Unanimous) || 3 || 3:00
|-
|-  bgcolor="#FFBBBB"
| 2007-06-23 || Loss ||align=left| Jiri Zak || 5 Knockout Fight Night, Final || Lucerne, Switzerland || Decision || 3 || 3:00
|-
! style=background:white colspan=9 |
|-
|-  bgcolor="#CCFFCC"
| 2007-06-23 || Win ||align=left| Baker Barakat || 5 Knockout Fight Night, Semi Final || Lucerne, Switzerland || Decision || 3 || 3:00
|-
|-  bgcolor="#FFBBBB"
| 2007-05-26 || Loss ||align=left| Yohan Lidon || Abano Grand Prix 2007 || Abano Terme, Italy || Decision || 3 || 3:00 
|-
|-  bgcolor="#CCFFCC"
| 2007-03-10 || Win ||align=left| Rayen Simson || Steko's Fight Night 23, Final || Munich, Germany || Decision (Unanimous) || 3 || 3:00
|-
! style=background:white colspan=9 |
|-
|-  bgcolor="#CCFFCC"
| 2007-03-10 || Win ||align=left| Thomas Hladky || Steko's Fight Night 23, Semi Final || Munich, Germany || Decision || 3 || 3:00
|-
|-  bgcolor="#FFBBBB"
| 2006-12-09 || Loss ||align=left| Najim Ettouhali || Judgement Day || Roosendaal, Netherlands || Decision || 5 || 3:00 
|-
|-  bgcolor="#FFBBBB"
| 2006-07-02 || Loss ||align=left| Ibrahim Tamazaev || King of the Kings 2 || Milan, Italy || Decision || 5 || 3:00 
|-
|-  bgcolor="#FFBBBB"
| 2006-03-11 || Loss ||align=left| Dany Bill || SuperLeague Apocalypse 2006 || Paris, France || Decision (Unanimous) || 3 || 3:00
|-
|-  bgcolor="#FFBBBB"
| 2006-01-28 || Loss ||align=left| Dmitry Shakuta || SuperLeague Hungary 2006 || Budapest, Hungary || Decision (Unanimous) || 3 || 3:00
|-
|-  bgcolor="#FFBBBB"
| 2005-10-22 || Loss ||align=left| Clifton Brown || SuperLeague Heavy Knockout 2005 || Vienna, Austria || Decision || 3 || 3:00
|-
|-  bgcolor="#CCFFCC"
| 2005-05-27 || Win ||align=left| Rosario Presti || Kombat League Venezia, Final || Mestre, Italy || Decision || 3 || 3:00
|-
! style=background:white colspan=9 |
|-
|-  bgcolor="#CCFFCC"
| 2005-05-27 || Win ||align=left| Salvatore Abate || Kombat League Venezia, Semi Final || Mestre, Italy || KO || 1 ||
|-
|-  bgcolor="#CCFFCC"
| 2005-05-27 || Win ||align=left| Guaye Dauda || Kombat League Venezia, Quarter Finals || Mestre, Italy || Decision || 3 || 3:00
|-
|-  bgcolor="#CCFFCC"
| 2005-05-21 || Win ||align=left| Moises Baptista De Sousa || SuperLeague Germany 2005 || Oberhausen, Germany || KO (High Kick) || 4 ||
|-
|-  bgcolor="#CCFFCC"
| 2005-04-05 || Win ||align=left| Ryan Roy || Lumpinee Stadium || Bangkok, Thailand || KO || 2 || 
|-
|-  bgcolor="#CCFFCC"
| 2005-03-19 || Win ||align=left| Ricardo Verschuren || || Turin, Italy || KO || 1 || 
|-
|-  bgcolor="#CCFFCC"
| 2005-02-19 || Win ||align=left| Roberto Castro || The King of Kings || Milan, Italy || TKO (Ref Stop/2 Knockdowns) || 2 || 
|-
! style=background:white colspan=9 |
|-
|-  bgcolor="#FFBBBB"
| 2004-12-11 || Loss ||align=left| Cesar Cordoba || Superliga 2004 Federacion Catalana || Barcelona, Spain || Decision || 5 || 3:00
|-
|-  bgcolor="#CCFFCC"
| 2004-04-24 || Win ||align=left| Shingo Eguchi || K-1 Italy 2004 || Milan, Italy || Decision || 5 || 3:00 
|-
|-  bgcolor="#FFBBBB"
| 2004-03-30 || Loss ||align=left| Jiri Zak || SuperLeague Italy 2004 || Padova, Italy || Decision || 5 || 3:00
|-
|-  bgcolor="#CCFFCC"
| 2003-12-06 || Win ||align=left| Yassine Perricot || || Collegno, Italy || Decision ||  || 
|-
|-  bgcolor="#FFBBBB"
| 2003-09-27 || Loss ||align=left| Joerie Mes || SuperLeague Germany 2003 || Wuppertal, Germany || KO || 4 || 
|-
|-  bgcolor="#CCFFCC"
| 2003-05-10 || Win ||align=left| Foad Sadeghi || SuperLeague Austria 2003 || Vienna, Austria || KO (Knee) || 4 ||
|-
|-  bgcolor="#CCFFCC"
| 2003-04-12 || Win ||align=left| Carlos Heredia || || Turin, Italy || TKO || 1 ||
|-
! style=background:white colspan=9 |
|-
|-  bgcolor="#CCFFCC"
| 2003-03-29 || Win ||align=left| Viorel Bondoc || || Rome, Italy || TKO || 3 ||
|-
! style=background:white colspan=9 |
|-
|-  bgcolor="#CCFFCC"
| 2002-11-30 || Win ||align=left| Takaaki Nakamura || Kickboxing Mondiale 3 || Padova, Italy || Decision || 5 || 3:00
|-
|-  bgcolor="#CCFFCC"
| 2002-06-19 || Win ||align=left| Isaul Torrão Soares || || São Paulo, Brazil || KO || 5 ||
|-
! style=background:white colspan=9 |
|-
|-  bgcolor="#CCFFCC"
| 2002-06-19 || Win ||align=left| Stephan Mbida || || Peschiera Borromeo, Italy || Decision || 5 || 3:00
|-
! style=background:white colspan=9 |
|-
|-  bgcolor="#CCFFCC"
| 2002-05-15 || Win ||align=left| Michele Verginelli || Oktagon Milano || Milan, Italy || KO || 5 || 
|-
|-  bgcolor="#CCFFCC"
| 2002-04-15 || Win ||align=left| Chucovich || || Collegno, Italy || Decision ||  || 
|-
|-  bgcolor="#CCFFCC"
| 2002-04-01 || Win ||align=left| Kugler || Oktagon Roma || Rome, Italy || KO || 1 || 
|-
|-  bgcolor="#CCFFCC"
| 2001-10-13 || Win ||align=left| Paolo Reverberi || || Bologna, Italy || KO || 2 || 
|-
|-  bgcolor="#CCFFCC"
| 2001-10-13 || Win ||align=left| Cico Zerbini || || Borgaro Torinese, Italy || Decision || || 
|-
|-  bgcolor="#CCFFCC"
| 2001-07-14 || Win ||align=left| Cloudran || || Casale Monferrato, Italy || Decision || || 
|-
|-  bgcolor="#CCFFCC"
| 2001-06-12 || Win ||align=left| Carlos Heredia || || Turin, Italy || Decision || 12 || 2:00
|-
! style=background:white colspan=9 |
|-
|-  bgcolor="#CCFFCC"
| 2001-04-14 || Win ||align=left| John Yale || || Turin, Italy || KO || 1 ||
|-
|-  bgcolor="#CCFFCC"
| 2001-02-24 || Win ||align=left| Clarence || || Montauban, France || Decision || || 
|-
|-  bgcolor="#FFBBBB"
| 2001-03-10 || Loss ||align=left| Bernard Mersch || || Saint-Étienne, France || Decision || ||  
|-
|-  bgcolor="#CCFFCC"
| 2001-02-24 || Win ||align=left| Giovanni Perlunger || || Trieste, Italy || Decision || || 
|-
|-  bgcolor="#c5d2ea"
| 2001-02-10 || Draw ||align=left| Alexander Dredhaj || || Collegno, Italy || Decision Draw || ||
|-
|-
| colspan=9 | Legend:

Boxing record

| style="text-align:center;" colspan="8"|16 Wins (6 knockouts, 10 decisions),  12 Losses (5 knockouts, 7 decisions), 1 Draw
|-  style="text-align:center; background:#e3e3e3;"
|  style="border-style:none none solid solid; "|Res.
|  style="border-style:none none solid solid; "|Record
|  style="border-style:none none solid solid; "|Opponent
|  style="border-style:none none solid solid; "|Type
|  style="border-style:none none solid solid; "|Rd., Time
|  style="border-style:none none solid solid; "|Date
|  style="border-style:none none solid solid; "|Location
|  style="border-style:none none solid solid; "|Notes
|- align=center
|Win
|align=center|19-23-3||align=left| Giorgi Kandelaki
|
|
|
|align=left|
|align=left|
|- align=center
|Win
|align=center|12-13-1||align=left| Goran Milenković
|
|
|
|align=left|
|align=left|
|- align=center
|Win
|align=center|4-11-0||align=left| Bojan Radović
|
|
|
|align=left|
|align=left|
|- align=center
|Loss
|align=center|13-0-2||align=left| Mickael Diallo
|
|
|
|align=left|
|align=left|
|- align=center
|Loss
|align=center|9-1-0||align=left| Valerio Ranaldi
|
|
|
|align=left|
|align=left| 
|- align=center
|Win
|align=center|18-81-4||align=left| Mugurel Sebe
|
|
|
|align=left|
|align=left|
|- align=center
|Loss
|align=center|7-1-0||align=left| Roberto Bassi
|
|
|
|align=left|
|align=left| 
|- align=center
|Loss
|align=center|16-2-0||align=left| Andrea Di Luisa
|
|
|
|align=left|
|align=left|
|- align=center
|Win
|align=center|4-2-1||align=left| Yassine Habachi
|
|
|
|align=left|
|align=left|
|- align=center
|- align=center
|Loss
|align=center|10-2-0||align=left| Mariano Hilario
|
|
|
|align=left|
|align=left|
|- align=center
|- align=center
|Win
|align=center|5-1-0||align=left| Ivan Stupalo
|
|
|
|align=left|
|align=left|
|- align=center
|- align=center
|Win
|align=center|14-12-1||align=left| Fabrizio Leone
|
|
|
|align=left|
|align=left|
|- align=center
|- align=center
|Win
|align=center|14-1-1||align=left| Alessio Furlan
|
|
|
|align=left|
|align=left|
|- align=center
|Loss
|align=center|14-1-1||align=left| Massimiliano Buccheri
|
|
|
|align=left|
|align=left|
|- align=center
|Win
|align=center|18-11-4||align=left| Luciano Lombardi
|
|
|
|align=left|
|align=left|
|- align=center
|Win
|align=center|7-1-1||align=left| Matteo Rossi
|
|
|
|align=left|
|align=left|
|- align=center
|Loss
|align=center|6-0-0||align=left| Robert Woge
|
|
|
|align=left|
|align=left|
|- align=center
|Loss
|align=center|18-0-0||align=left| Dustin Dirks
|
|
|
|align=left|
|align=left|
|- align=center
|Loss
|align=center|11-0-1||align=left| Henry Weber
|
|
|
|align=left|
|align=left|
|- align=center
|Loss
|align=center|8-0-1||align=left| Danilo D'Agata
|
|
|
|align=left|
|align=left|
|- align=center
|Draw
|align=center|8-1-0||align=left| Massimiliano Buccheri
|
|
|
|align=left|
|align=left|
|- align=center
|Loss
|align=center|7-0-0||align=left| Andrea Di Luisa
|
|
|
|align=left|
|align=left|
|- align=center
|Loss
|align=center|9-0-0||align=left| Artur Hein
|
|
|
|align=left|
|align=left|
|- align=center
|Win
|align=center|8-51-3||align=left| Attila Kiss
|
|
|
|align=left|
|align=left|
|- align=center
|Loss
|align=center|50-2-10||align=left| Mads Larsen
|
|
|
|align=left|
|align=left|
|- align=center
|Loss
|align=center|13-1-0||align=left| Mouhamed Ali Ndiaye
|
|
|
|align=left|
|align=left|
|- align=center
|Win
|align=center|8-1-0||align=left| Vigan Mustafa
|
|
|
|align=left|
|align=left|
|- align=center
|Loss
|align=center|9-0-0||align=left| Nikola Sjekloća
|
|
|
|align=left|
|align=left|
|- align=center
|Win
|align=center|5-2-0||align=left| Alex Celotto
|
|
|
|align=left|
|align=left|
|- align=center
|Win
|align=center|6-1-1||align=left| Cristiano Cannas
|
|
|
|align=left|
|align=left|
|- align=center
|Win
|align=center|2-5-0||align=left| Zoran Plavsić
|
|
|
|align=left|
|align=left|
|- align=center
|Win
|align=center|0-0-0||align=left| Jovan Rakonjać
|
|
|
|align=left|
|align=left|
|- align=center
|Win
|align=center|1-3-0||align=left| Stefano Votano
|
|
|
|align=left|
|align=left|
|- align=center
|Win
|align=center|5-2-0||align=left| Jeno Markhot
|
|
|
|align=left|
|align=left|
|- align=center
|Win
|align=center|1-3-2||align=left| Béla Kiss
|
|
|
|align=left|
|align=left|
|- align=center
|Win
|align=center|1-0-0||align=left| Alexander Dredhaj
|
|
|
|align=left|
|align=left|

External links 
Roberto Cocco Official Site
Best K-1 Website on the net

See also 
List of male kickboxers

References

1977 births
Living people
Italian male kickboxers
Middleweight kickboxers
Light heavyweight kickboxers
Super-middleweight boxers
Italian Muay Thai practitioners
Sportspeople from Turin
Italian male boxers
SUPERKOMBAT kickboxers